This is a list of the peaks in the Yorkshire Dales. To avoid the list becoming infinitely long and arbitrary, only hills with more than 30 m relative height are included. This includes all Marilyns and Hewitts as well as many other hills. Marilyns are peaks in the British Isles with 150 m of relative height; Hewitts are peaks in England, Ireland and Wales over 2000 ft (610 m) elevation, with at least 30 m relative height. There are 22 Marilyns and 28 Hewitts in the Yorkshire Dales National Park.

Topographically, the boundaries of the Yorkshire Dales trace the flow of streams from the lowest points between it and the neighbouring regions of the Lake District, North Pennines, Forest of Bowland, South Pennines and North York Moors.

Hills are grouped as topographically as possible, according to their 'parent Marilyn'. The parent Marilyn of hill A can be found by dividing the nearby area into territories, by tracing the runoff from the key col of each Marilyn. The parent is the Marilyn whose territory hill A resides in. Marilyns are given in bold, followed by the hills within their territories, which are delineated in the map.

In the table headers, H stands for height and RH for relative height.

Northern Dales

Southern Dales

 
Yorkshire Dales
Peaks